The Bell Inn is a grade II listed former public house in Hertford Road, Enfield Wash, Enfield. The building dates from the second quarter of the 19th century. The facade has a projecting loggia with Roman Doric columns. It later operated under names including  Bar FM,  Chimes, the Texas Cantina and Club X Zone, and has since housed a Turkish restaurant.

References

External links

Enfield, London
Pubs in the London Borough of Enfield
Grade II listed pubs in London